Melbert Brinckerhoff Cary (July 23, 1852 – March 17, 1946) was Chairman of the Democratic Party of Connecticut.

Cary was born on July 23, 1852 in Racine, Wisconsin. He was the son of the Wisconsin politician John W. Cary. In 1880, he married Julia Metcalf. Cary's son, Melbert Jr., became a noted graphic artist.

Cary was Chairman of the Democratic Party of Connecticut from 1898 to 1900. In 1902, he was a candidate for Governor of Connecticut, losing to Abiram Chamberlain. He was also a delegate to the 1908 Democratic National Convention.

References

External links

Politicians from Racine, Wisconsin
Connecticut Democrats
1852 births
1946 deaths